Millport is an unincorporated community in Knox County, in the U.S. state of Missouri.

History
A post office called Millport was established in 1858, and remained in operation until 1901. The community was named for a watermill near the original town site.

References

Unincorporated communities in Knox County, Missouri
Unincorporated communities in Missouri